Sillajata (possibly from Quechua silla gravel, qhata slope, "gravel slope") is a  mountain in the Vilcanota mountain range in the Andes of Peru. It is situated in the Puno Region, Melgar Province, Nuñoa District. It lies south of Jonorana and southeast of Salla Huancane.

References

Mountains of Puno Region
Mountains of Peru